There is no county-wide local education authority in Bedfordshire, instead education services are provided by the three smaller unitary authorities of Bedford, Central Bedfordshire and Luton: 

 List of schools in Bedford
 List of schools in Central Bedfordshire
 List of schools in Luton